The Women’s European Baseball Championship (WEBC) is the main championship tournament between national women’s baseball teams in Europe, governed by the Confederation of European Baseball (CEB).

History
The 2019 Women’s European Baseball Championship was held in July and August 2019 in Rouen, France. France, the winner of the championship, qualified for 2020 Women's Baseball World Cup. 

The 2022 Women’s European Baseball Championship was held on Wednesday, August 3 to Saturday, August 6 2022. Montpellier in France hosted the second edition, which also served as qualifying event for the next WBC Women’s Baseball World Cup. Four teams participated with host and defending champion France, the Netherlands, Czech Republic and Great Britain. France defeated the Czech Republic in the final (13-3) and qualified for the next Baseball World Cup which will be held in 2023.

Results

Medal table

Participating nations

References 

WBSC Europe competitions
Women's baseball competitions
European championships